Brendon Doyle Bermingham (26 May 1914 – 10 December 1975) was an Australian rules footballer who played with St Kilda in the Victorian Football League (VFL).

Notes

External links 

1914 births
1975 deaths
Australian rules footballers from Western Australia
St Kilda Football Club players
Claremont Football Club players
Mines Rovers Football Club players